Maartje Yvonne Helene Paumen (born 19 September 1985) is a former Dutch field hockey player. She is currently assistant coach for Dutch club MOP. She previously played for Dutch clubs Oranje Zwart and HC Den Bosch and Belgian club Royal Antwerp. She also played for the Netherlands national team and she was part of the Dutch squad that became world champions at the 2006 Women's Hockey World Cup in Madrid and the 2014 Women's Hockey World Cup in The Hague. She also won the 2007 Champions Trophy and the 2011 Champions Trophy. With 195 goals in 235 games, she is the all-time top scorer for the Dutch national team. She is also all-time top scorer in the national Dutch hockey league, the Hoofdklasse.

At the 2008 Summer Olympics in Beijing, she won an Olympic gold medal with the Dutch national team beating China in the final 2–0. The team kept its Olympic title at the 2012 Summer Olympics in London beating the Argentinian team 2–0 in the final. She scored the second point from a penalty and this was her fourteenth goal at the Olympics, which makes her the top Olympic scorer ever. In the 2016 Summer Olympics in Rio de Janeiro she won an Olympic silver medal, after losing to Great Britain in penalty shootouts. She was also the Top Scorer of the 2010 Women's Hockey World Cup as well as the 2014 Women's Hockey World Cup. She is openly lesbian. Paumen has been selected as FIH Player of the Year in 2011 and 2012.

References

External links
 
 

1985 births
Living people
Dutch female field hockey players
Field hockey players at the 2008 Summer Olympics
Field hockey players at the 2012 Summer Olympics
Medalists at the 2008 Summer Olympics
Medalists at the 2012 Summer Olympics
Olympic field hockey players of the Netherlands
Olympic gold medalists for the Netherlands
Olympic medalists in field hockey
People from Geleen
Lesbian sportswomen
LGBT field hockey players
Dutch LGBT sportspeople
Field hockey players at the 2016 Summer Olympics
Medalists at the 2016 Summer Olympics
Olympic silver medalists for the Netherlands
HC Den Bosch players
Sportspeople from Limburg (Netherlands)
Dutch field hockey coaches
20th-century Dutch women
21st-century Dutch women